Events from the year 1962 in Romania. The year saw the end of the collectivization of agriculture and increasing de-satellization of Communist Romania as the country last publicly supported the Soviet Union against China and took part is Warsaw Pact army exercises.

Incumbents
President of the State Council and General Secretary of the Romanian Communist Party: Gheorghe Gheorghiu-Dej.
Prime Minister: Ion Gheorghe Maurer.

Events
 3 March – As part of the de-satellization of Communist Romania, the country declares official and public support support for the Soviet Union against the People's Republic of China for the last time in a letter.
 April 28 – At a session of the Great National Assembly, Gheorghe Gheorghiu-Dej declares that the collectivization of agriculture is complete.
 19 September – The last joint exercise between the Romanian Land Forces and the armies of other Warsaw Pact members ends.

Cinema and theatre
 Allo Allo, directed by Ion Popescu-Gopo, debuts in Romania.
 A Bomb Was Stolen, directed by Popescu-Gopo, is nominated for the Palme d'Or at the 1962 Cannes Film Festival.

Births
 2 January – Cristieana Cojocaru, winner of bronze in the hurdles at the 1984 Summer Olympics.
 7 January – Florica Lavric, rower, gold medal winner at the 1984 Summer Olympics (died 2014).
 26 February – Viorica Ioja, rower, gold medal winner at the 1984 Summer Olympics.
 5 May – Rodica Arba, rower, winner of seven medals including gold at the 1984 and 1988 Summer Olympics.
 28 June – Anișoara Cușmir-Stanciu, long jumper, gold medal winner at the 1984 Summer Olympics.
 10 August – Horia Gârbea, playwright, poet and novelist.
 28 October – Liviu Dragnea, engineer and politician, leader of the Social Democratic Party between 2016 and 2019.
 9 November – Marioara Popescu, rower gold medal winner at the 1984 and 1996 Summer Olympics.
 11 November – Ildikó Raimondi, soprano.

Deaths
 6 May – Virginia Andreescu Haret, architect (born 1894).
 29 May – Gheorghe Arsenescu, officer who led a group of anti-communist resistance fighters, executed at Jilava Prison (born 1907).
 2 September – Natalia Negru, poet and writer (born 1882).
 17 November – Sandu Tudor, poet, journalist, theologian, and Orthodox monk, who died in Aiud Prison (born 1896).
 12 December – Felix Aderca, modernist writer (born 1891).

References

Years of the 20th century in Romania
1960s in Romania
1962 in Romania
Romania
Romania